Jay Manalo (born Jay Lan Manalo on 30 January 1976 in Saigon, South Vietnam) is a Filipino actor, model, and singer.  He was born in South Vietnam but raised in Tondo, Manila. He was born to a Filipino father and Vietnamese mother.

Early life
Manalo was born in Saigon, South Vietnam but raised in Tondo, Manila. He was born to a Filipino father and Vietnamese mother. His father is Estaquio Manalo Jr.

Career
After he won as 1st runner-up of SM Man of the Year he became a model/endorser of Blowing Bubbles.

Movies
His film debut was through the action movie Brat Pack in 1994. He became a lead in his second film, Paracale Gang, which was released in 1996 and followed by the movie Urban Rangers. That same year, he did a switch from action to sexy roles when he starred in the movie Gayuma opposite Amanda Page. Possessing boyish looks and an oozing sex appeal, he became a staple of sexy movies in the Philippines, with the film Totoy Mola pushing him to sexy stardom.

After Totoy Mola, he played lead in "bold flicks" like Kool Ka Lang, Kaliwat Kanan, Sakit sa Katawan, Bayad Puri, Bawal na Halik and Balahibong Pusa. By the turn of the century, his roles had become more serious and dramatic. His recent performances have been well received by movie critics, and he has won a number of acting awards in the Philippines. Some of his noticeable portrayals are in the films Prosti, Bayarán, Ang Huling Birhen sa Lupa, Hubog, Aishite Imasu 1941: Mahal Kita and Mano Po 3: My Love. He ventured into other film genres, having starred recently in comedies such as I Will Survive and Ako Legal Wife and in fantasy / horror films such as Gagamboy, Feng Shui, and his latest film Barang.

He voiced Simakwel in Urduja whom was the titular character's fiancé. The film also stars Regine Velasquez, Cesar Montano, Eddie Garcia and Johnny Delgado.

His latest movie role was in 2011's Shake, Rattle & Roll 13 as Mar in the episode, Rain Rain Go Away.

Television
Jay Manalo has been part of the cast of soap operas. His TV career started with the top-rated soap in 1997, Mula Sa Puso, (ABS-CBN) which starred Claudine Barretto. He followed it up with other appearances in soaps like Pangako Sa 'Yo (ABS-CBN) and Kung Mawawala Ka (GMA Network).

His breakthrough role in television is his portrayal in the soap opera, Vietnam Rose in ABS-CBN in 2005. He plays Miguel, a Vietnamese businessman who was Carina's (played by Maricel Soriano) first love. Though the performances of the cast were well-cited by critics, the ratings were disappointing. After Vietnam Rose, he was included in the cast of GMA's TV adaptation of Bakekang. He played Christoph, an actor and a love interest of the lead role, Bakekang, played by Sunshine Dizon and Valeria, played by Sheryl Cruz. Bakekang became one of the top-rated shows in the Philippines. He recently starred in his new action-adventure series on GMA titled Zaido: Pulis Pangkalawakan as Drigo, a Filipino version of Hessler of Shaider.

Manalo was last seen in the teleserye FPJ's Ang Probinsyano on ABS-CBN.

Personal life
His Filipino father, Eustaquio G. Manalo, Jr., was a musician based in South Vietnam during the Vietnam War; Jay's mother is Vietnamese. After Jay was born, they moved to Manila and by the time he was five, his parents separated, his mother forced to leave him.

In 1981, his father went abroad to work as a musician and entertainer, leaving Jay with his grandmother. Jay reunited with his father in 1993, and two years later with his mother. She has since married a United States Navy serviceman; Eustaquio continued with his passion for music.

Despite being married, Manalo has admitted that he has eleven children with six different women.

Bomb joke
Manalo was released to the custody of his lawyer on 6 July 2007, a day after cracking a bomb joke at Ninoy Aquino International Airport while about to board a morning flight to Puerto Princesa, Palawan. Prosecutor Ticyado had ordered Atty. E. Teodoro to take him into custody, as bomb jokes are criminal offences in the country.

Manalo was earlier removed from Philippine Airlines flight PR185 after telling a flight attendant that there was a bomb in his backpack. The prosecutor found that Manalo was only cracking a joke and had no intention of carrying explosives nor harming any of the passengers in the Palawan-bound flight.

Filmography

Television

Film

References and sources

References

External links
 

1973 births
Living people
ABS-CBN personalities
GMA Network personalities
TV5 (Philippine TV network) personalities
Filipino male child actors
Filipino male television actors
Filipino people of Vietnamese descent
Male actors from Manila
People from Ho Chi Minh City
People from Tondo, Manila
Star Magic
Viva Artists Agency
Vietnamese emigrants to the Philippines
Vietnamese people of Filipino descent
Filipino male film actors